Moskusryggen is a mountain ridge in Sabine Land at Spitsbergen, Svalbard. The mountain has a relatively flat top, and is about eight kilometer long with a width of about 2.5 kilometers. It is located west of the glacier Rabotbreen.

References

Mountains of Spitsbergen